Fiddler's Green is a hamlet in the English county of Herefordshire.

It is located near the River Wye on the B4224 road that connects Hereford and Ross-on-Wye.

References

External links 

Villages in Herefordshire